WVRE (101.1 FM) is a radio station  broadcasting a Country format. Licensed to Dickeyville, Wisconsin, United States, the station serves the Dubuque area.  The station is currently owned by Radio Dubuque, Inc. and features programming from Fox News Radio.

WVRE plays "Continuous Country Favorites" including commercial free music from 8:30am to 10:40am weekdays. Without corporate restrictions, "The River" is often the first to play New Country. WVRE includes The Morning Show with host Maverick Lee, mid-days with Mike Baumgartner, and afternoons with Zach Dillon. Other programs aired include, The Nashville Music Minute, The Hitlist with Fitz, Thunder Road, and sports with University of Dubuque football.

References

External links

VRE
Country radio stations in the United States
Radio stations established in 1991